The Square Ring is a 1952 play by Ralph Peterson.

Premise
The story of several boxers who are fighting on the one night. They include Docker Starkie, a boxer making a comeback.

Background
Peterson wrote an Australian radio play about boxing, Come Out Fighting which aired in 1950.

Peterson moved to London in 1951 and wrote a stage version, The Square Ring, over a three-month period.  He sent the play to Anthony Quayle, whom he had met in Sydney when Quayle was touring with the Stratford Players (Quayle had appeared in a radio play written by Peterson about Aboriginal issues, "The Problem of Johnny Flourcake"). Quayle was going to put it on himself but then accepted another theatrical tour of Australia so he passed it to H. M. Tennents, the London theatre agency, who agreed to produce it.

After several weeks of rehearsal, the play premiered in Brighton in September 1952 with a mostly male cast but one female, the wife of the central character. Peterson said "the play never seemed to jell. It got wacky and the girl seemed to be distracting attention from the main story." So he made it an all male story. He also changed it by "I've done away with the normal compression of time. The running time of the play is exactly the period it would take a boxer to arrive in his dressing-room, to wait for his bout, and to complete his fight. It goes on without a break."

Peterson said "The play's only philosophy is: What makes men fight? The answer is simply — money."

The play debuted in London in October 1952 and was acclaimed. It  was produced in Melbourne in 1953 at Frank Thring's Arrow Theatre with Thring in the cast. The play received some criticism because of its language but was such a success that the production was transferred to the much larger Princess Theatre. 

Joe Louis expressed interest in appearing in a production.

1953 film
The play was the basis of The Square Ring produced at Ealing Studios.

1954 novel
Peterson adapted the play into a novel which was published in 1954.

1959 TV adaptation
The play was adapted for British TV in 1959 for ITV Play of the Week with Sean Connery.

Cast
George Baker as Docker Starkie
Sean Connery as Rick Martell
Alan Bates as Eddie Burke
Alfred Burke as Frank Ford
David Davies as Danny Felton
Arthur Gomez as Manager
Thomas Heathcote as Sailor Johnston
Percy Herbert as Rowdie Rawlings
Harry Landis as Happy Coombes
Neil McCarthy as Watty
David Waller as Doctor
Vic Wise as Joe

1960 Australian TV adaptation
See 1960 Australian TV adaptation

1965 Radio Adaptation
The play was adapted for radio in 1965.

Cast
Dan Crosby
Max Osbiston
John Gray
Edward Hepple
John Armstrong
Robert MacDara
Alastair Duncan
Richard Meikle
Ben Gabriel
James Congdon.

References

External links

1959 British TV version at IMDb
Square Ring Australian Theatre performances at Ausstage

British drama films
Boxing in art
Plays about sport